Anabaenopsis is a genus of filamentous, heterocystous cyanobacteria that reproduces by fragmentation and with akinetes. Anabaenopsis can produce microcystins, which are toxic to both humans and animals.  The genus is primarily tropical and subtropical, with some species creating blooms in temperate regions during warmer seasons. Anabaenopsis contains bloom-formers among planktonic species.

The type species for the genus is Anabaenopsis elenkinii V.V.Miller, 1923.

References

External links
 

Nostocales
Cyanobacteria genera